Mount Gould Station is a pastoral lease that used to operate as a sheep station but now operates as a cattle station in Western Australia.

Occupying an area of  the property contains  of nature reserves and vacant crown land. The soil has a low level of erosion with 88% of the land being described as nil or minor. The perennial vegetation condition is described as fair with 78% of vegetation cover being described as poor or very poor. It is estimated that the property is able to carry 9,190 sheep in summer conditions, but has stocked over 13,020 sheep over summer.

An expedition led by Francis Thomas Gregory in 1858 surveyed the area around Mount Gould and Mount Hale finding a succession of rich grassy flats having a network of rivers that ran into the Murchison or Gascoyne Rivers.

The property was advertised in 1887 when Messrs A. T. Cruikshank and Co. put it on the market along with Yalgoo Station and Balloo Station.

The area is rich in the iron oxide minerals such as haematite.

See also
List of ranches and stations

References

Pastoral leases in Western Australia
Stations (Australian agriculture)
Mid West (Western Australia)